Sarge Goes to College is a 1947 American musical comedy film directed by Will Jason and starring Freddie Stewart, June Preisser and Frankie Darro. It was produced and distributed by Monogram Pictures as part of The Teen Agers series.

Plot
A sergeant in the marines is wounded in combat.  He returns to America and temporarily enrolls in college and has to adjust to student life.

Cast
 Freddie Stewart as Freddie Trimball
 June Preisser as 	Dodie Rogers
 Frankie Darro as 	Roy Donne
 Warren Mills as 	Lee Watson
 Noel Neill as 	Betty Rogers
 Alan Hale Jr. as Sarge
 Arthur Walsh as 	Arthur Walsh
 Russ Morgan as Russ Morgan
 Monte Collins as 	Dean McKinley
 Frank Cady as 	Prof. Edwards
 Margaret Brayton as 	Miss Koregmeyer
 Selmer Jackson as 	Marine Capt. R.S. Handler
 Earl Bennett as 	Eddie
 Margaret Bert as Mrs. Rogers 
 Harry Tyler as Mr. Rogers
 Pat Goldin as 	Rooming House Manager
 William Forrest as 	Col. Winters

References

External links

1947 films
1947 musical comedy films
1940s teen films
American black-and-white films
American musical comedy films
Monogram Pictures films
1940s high school films
Films directed by Will Jason
Films set in universities and colleges
1940s English-language films
1940s American films